Annabel Abbs (born 20 October 1964) is an English writer and novelist.

Early life
The daughter of poet and academic, Professor Peter Abbs and gardening writer, Barbara Abbs, Annabel Abbs lives in London and East Sussex. She is the eldest of three children and was born in Bristol. She grew up in Bristol, Dorset, Wales, and Lewes in East Sussex. Her early childhood included stints of home-schooling in a remote Welsh village where her family lived without a car, telephone, television or central heating. She later attended Lewes Priory school and has a BA in English Literature from the University of East Anglia, and an MA from Kingston University.

Career
Her first novel, The Joyce Girl, was published in 2016 and tells a fictionalised story of Lucia Joyce, daughter of James Joyce. It won the Impress Prize for New Writers, the Spotlight First Novel Award, was longlisted for the Bath Novel Award, the Caledonia Novel Award and the Waverton Good Read Award. The Joyce Girl was a Reader Pick in The Guardian 2016 and was one of ten books selected for presentation at the 2017 Berlin Film Festival, where it was given Five Stars by the Hollywood Reporter. The Joyce Girl was published in the UK, Ireland, Australia, New Zealand, Germany, Turkey, Spain, South America, Bulgaria, Poland and Russia. The Historical Novel Society described The Joyce Girl as "the best 20th century fiction of the year."

Abbs’ second novel, Frieda, tells the fictionalised story of the elopement of Frieda Weekley, wife of Ernest Weekley, with writer D.H. Lawrence in 1912. Previously Frieda von Richthofen, sister of Else von Richthofen, Frieda was a German aristocrat who later became the inspiration for many of Lawrence's female characters including Ursula in Women in Love and Connie in Lady Chatterley’s Lover. Abbs’ novel was published in 2018 in Australia/New Zealand by Hachette and in the UK by Two Roads, part of John Murray Press. It has sold in several countries including Italy, Hungary, Bulgaria, Germany, France and Turkey.

Frieda was selected as one of five novels to be presented to film directors at the 2017 Frankfurt Book Fair. It was a 2018 Times Book of the year (historical fiction) and described in The Observer as ‘exuberant’ and ‘compelling’. In 2019 Abbs delivered the annual DH Lawrence Birthday lecture alongside Dr Annalise Grice

In 2019 Abbs was described in The Observer "as one of the best historical novelists today" by literature critic, Alexander Larman.

Abbs’ first non-fiction book, The Age-Well Project, co-written with, Susan Saunders, was published by Piatkus in May 2019 and serialised in The Daily Mail and The Guardian.

She has written for The Guardian, The Telegraph, The Irish Times, Tatler, The Author, Sydney Morning Herald, The Weekend Australian Review, Psychologies and Elle Magazine. Abbs speaks regularly at literary festivals and delivers Masterclasses for The Guardian.

Abbs was a judge of the Impress Prize for New Writers in 2017 and 2019. and supports a post-graduate student of creative writing at the University of East Anglia each year.

Controversy

Abbs's first book was criticised in reviews in the Irish Times and Irish Examiner for the author's "unsubstantiated speculations" on matters including incest between Lucia Joyce and her brother, and the causes of her mental illness. In A Companion to Literary Biography (ed. Robert Bradford, Wiley Blackwell, 2019), Joyce scholar Professor John McCourt, a trustee of the International James Joyce Foundation, wrote that "With Abbs, the perverse cycle of interest in Lucia comes full circle. We are back in the territory of fiction fraudulently posing as biography", and concluded it to be "a prime contender for the worst Joyce-inspired 'biography' ever."

Published works 
Abbs, Annabel (2016), The Joyce Girl, Impress, UK, 2016 

Abbs, Annabel (2018), Frieda, Two Roads, UK, 2018 

Streets, Annabel (2019), The Age-Well Project, Piatkus, UK, 2019

References

External links 
 

1964 births
Living people
English women novelists
21st-century English women writers
21st-century English novelists
Alumni of the University of East Anglia
Alumni of Kingston University
Writers from Bristol